Wagner Lindsell "Lin-J" Shell Jr. (October 22, 1981 – July 29, 2021) was an American professional football player who was a defensive back in the Canadian Football League (CFL). He was originally signed by the Arena Football League's (AFL) Orlando Predators as a street free agent in 2004. He played college football at Jacksonville.

Shell was also a member of the Philadelphia Eagles, New Orleans VooDoo, Calgary Stampeders (where he helped the team win the Grey Cup), Toronto Argonauts (where he was a 2-time CFL East All-Star), BC Lions, and Winnipeg Blue Bombers.

Subsequent to his all-star career with the CFL, Shell taught physical education at Jean Ribault High School in Jacksonville, Florida and coach Football and Jackson High school. On May 9, 2018, Shell was instrumental in preventing a woman from using her handgun in the school gymnasium following a "social media" brawl.

Shell died from a stroke in Florida on July 29, 2021, at the age 39. According to his family, he also tested positive for COVID-19 during the COVID-19 pandemic in Florida.

References

External links
Calgary Stampeders bio

1981 births
2021 deaths
African-American players of American football
African-American players of Canadian football
African-American schoolteachers
Schoolteachers from Florida
American football defensive backs
BC Lions players
Canadian football defensive backs
Calgary Stampeders players
Jacksonville Dolphins football players
New Orleans VooDoo players
Orlando Predators players
Players of American football from Orlando, Florida
Players of Canadian football from Orlando, Florida
Philadelphia Eagles players
Toronto Argonauts players
Cologne Centurions (NFL Europe) players
Winnipeg Blue Bombers players
20th-century African-American people
21st-century African-American sportspeople